Jon-Håkon Schultz (born 28 March 1968) is a Norwegian educational psychologist and researcher on violence, terrorism and crisis psychology. He is a Research Professor at the Norwegian Centre for Violence and Traumatic Stress Studies and Professor of Educational Psychology at the University of Tromsø.

He is an expert on crisis psychology, particularly relating to children and youth, and is involved in research on the impact of the 2011 Norway attacks, on former child soldiers, and on child sexual abuse. He has published several books, and is also a frequent media commentator in these fields in Norway. He has his cand.paed.spec. degree (1996) and his dr.polit. (PhD) degree (2006), both in special needs education, from the University of Oslo. Jon-Håkon Schultz has been Vice President of UNICEF Norway.

References

External links

Norwegian educationalists
Norwegian Centre for Violence and Traumatic Stress Studies people
Academic staff of the University of Tromsø
UNICEF people
Living people
1968 births
Norwegian officials of the United Nations